Little Compton is an unincorporated community in Carroll County, in the U.S. state of Missouri.

History
A post office called Little Compton was established in 1850, and remained in operation until 1903. With construction of the railroad, business activity shifted to other nearby places and Little Compton's population dwindled.

References

Unincorporated communities in Carroll County, Missouri
Unincorporated communities in Missouri